inDrive (previously known as inDriver), is an international ride-hailing service with more than 150 million downloads operating in 47 countries. Headquartered in Mountain View, California, it is the second largest ridesharing and taxi app worldwide by downloads. The company was officially launched in 2013.

It is one of the fastest growing international passenger transport service operating on the peer-to-peer pricing model. In the inDrive app, all conditions of the trip are determined as a result of an agreement between passengers and drivers. inDrive works both in small towns with a population of 10 thousand inhabitants, often with weak internet and without maps of the settlement, and in the largest cities with the highest level of competition. According to OZY, the fees that takes from drivers' receipts average 5–8% of the fare, which is significantly less than other major ride-hailing services. Passengers make all payments for rides directly to drivers in cash or non-cash settlements. The inDrive mobile app is available on Android and iOS.

History
inDriver was founded in 2012 in Yakutsk, one of the coldest cities in the world. The service originated when a group of local students established a collective group of "independent drivers" (i.e. inDrivers) on social media in response to a sharp increase in taxi prices when outside temperatures dropped precipitously. Members of the group shared where they wanted to go and the prices they were willing to pay, allowing drivers to in turn contact these customers and negotiate prices. One year later, the group moved to the Sinet Company which created a peer-to-peer transportation-based system based on this concept.
 
In 2013, inDriver was officially launched.

International expansion 
In December 2014, inDriver expanded internationally by launching in Astana, Kazakhstan.
 
The company entered Latin America in April 2018, when the service became available in Mexico and then later in Guatemala, Colombia, Peru, El Salvador, Chile, Brazil, Ecuador and Bolivia.
 
In November 2018, the service became available in Africa with the launch in Arusha, Tanzania.
 
The company announced further plans to launch services in 300 more cities in 30 countries by the end of 2019.
 
To date, the service has expanded its business throughout Latin America, Africa, India and Southwest Asia.
 
In 2018, the company opened a temporary office in New York City, and later, established its headquarters in Mountain View, California.

It also started its operations in Pakistan by 2021 and became the most-downloaded ride-hailing app in the country within a year.

In June 2022, inDriver announced that it was entering the Australian market, with an initial launch in Melbourne.

Corporate development
In February 2017 the service passed the threshold of 100 million rides booked through the InDriver mobile app. There were more than 5 million registered users at the time.
 
In April 2020, because of COVID-19 pandemic-related lockdowns, the company suspended launches in new countries to focus on servicing its existing markets. Among other initiatives, inDriver launched its "Medical Worker On The Way" program to help healthcare workers around the world get to and from work. Despite of the lockdowns, however, inDriver managed to reach 50 million app-downloads in July 2020.
 
In early 2021, inDriver achieved unicorn status after closing a $150m investment round with Insight Partners, General Catalyst, and Bond Capital, which valued the company at $1.23 billion. It reached 1 billion trips in May 2021.
 
By March 2022, inDriver had established regional operational hubs in the Americas, Asia, the Middle East, Africa and the CIS to support its expanding business.
 
inDriver also offers additional services through its app, including courier services, services, cargo/freight delivery and Intercity transportation. inDriver is the world's fastest-growing online ride-hailing and transportation services. The app has been downloaded more than 150 million times. The service is available in over 700 cities in 47 countries around the world.

In October 2022, inDriver rebranded and became inDrive, transforming into a group of companies.

In February 2023, inDrive raised $150m in an innovative hybrid instrument from General Catalyst for marketing and growth, expansion into new verticals.

App description 
To request a ride, the user specifies the starting point and destination address of the ride, the price they are willing to pay and if they have any comments for the driver. Drivers can make a counter-offer to the price offered by the passenger. Other options include adding additional destinations, indicating the need for a child seat, etc. The information of the car and driver confirmed for the service will appear on the passenger's phone screen. This includes the driver's rating and contact, the car's approximate arrival time and its real-time geolocation point on the map.

Awards 
inDriver was nominated for the GSMA Global Mobile Awards (GLOMO) 2019 in the 'Most Innovative Mobile App' category.

The service was named Google Play's 2019 Best Everyday Essential app in Brazil.   
 
inDrive won the SHIELD Trust Awards 2022.

See also 
 DiDi
 Grab
 Yandex Taxi
 Uber
 Lyft

References

External links

Companies based in Mountain View, California
Internet properties established in 2013
Road transport in Russia
Online companies of Russia
Online companies of the United States
Russian websites
Transport companies of Russia
Transportation companies of the United States
Transport companies established in 2013
Ridesharing companies of the United States
Mobile software
Android (operating system) software
IOS software